Michael Anderson (born 23 April 1960) is an English List A cricketer who played his only List A game for  Northumberland Cricket Club.  His highest score of 11 came when playing for Northumberland in the match against Middlesex County Cricket Club.

He has also played 19 Minor Counties Championship games for Northumberland. and 4  Minor Counties Trophy for the same team.

References

1960 births
Living people
Cricketers from Newcastle upon Tyne
English cricketers
Northumberland cricketers